Silvia Vasquez-Lavado (born 1974) is a Peruvian-American explorer, mountaineer, social entrepreneur and technologist. In June 2018, she became the first openly lesbian woman to complete the Seven Summits, the tallest mountain on each continent from both the Messner and Bass lists.

Early years 
Silvia Vasquez-Lavado was born and raised in Lima, Peru, during the Peruvian terrorist movement, the Shining Path. Vasquez-Lavado was a victim of childhood sexual abuse. After sharing her struggles with childhood abuse, Vasquez-Lavado's mother encouraged her to leave Peru.

Vasquez-Lavado came to the US on an IIE/Fulbright scholarship and attended Millersville University. She lives in San Francisco.

Mountain climbing 
Vasquez-Lavado struggled with depression during her 20s as a result of the trauma from her abuse. In 2005, while attending a meditation retreat in Peru, Vasquez-Lavado had a vision of reconnecting to her inner child and the two of them walking in a valley surrounded by mountains.

Shortly after, Vasquez-Lavado decided to go to the base of Mount Everest in October 2005. After a four-day trek, Vasquez-Lavado arrived at the base of Everest and climbed Kala Pattar. She later summited Everest in May 2016. She is one of the few women in the world who have completed the “Eight Summits” as of 2019, climbing the Seven Summits across both the Bass and Messner lists.

Mountaineering summits 
 Kilimanjaro (Tanzania) in September 2006
 Mount Elbrus (Russia) in August 2007
 Aconcagua (Argentina) in January 2014
 Mount Kosciuszko (Australia) in March 2015
 Carstensz Pyramid (Indonesia) in March 2015 
 Vinson Massif (Antarctica) in December 2015
 Mount Everest (Nepal) in May 2016
 Denali / McKinley (Alaska) in June 2018

Social impact 
In 2014, Vasquez-Lavado launched Courageous Girls, a nonprofit that helps survivors of sexual abuse and trafficking with opportunities to find their strength and cultivate their voice by demonstrating their physical strength. Courageous Girls has had projects in Nepal, India, the US and Peru.

In The Shadow of The Mountain 
In The Shadow of the Mountain, Silvia's first memoir was released February 1, 2022, in the US, and internationally on February 3, 2022. In a review in The New York Times, Qian Julie Wang wrote: "Patriarchal societies champion summit journeys as tales of conquest. But Vasquez-Lavado understands that ‘we do not conquer Everest, just like we do not conquer trauma. Instead, we must yield ourselves to the chasms and unexpected avalanches.’ And herein lies the wisdom of this work, aptly subtitled ‘A Memoir of Courage’: In a world that demands us to harden, to tell stories of strength and triumph, the bravest act can be embracing our inner child, our fears, our truths." Kirkus Reviews called In The Shadow of the Mountain "An emotionally raw and courageous memoir."

In November 2020, The Hollywood Reporter announced that Selena Gomez is set to be cast as Vasquez-Lavado on the film adaption of In The Shadow of the Mountain.

Honors and awards 
Vasquez-Lavado was recognized by Fortune magazine as one of the Corporate Heroes of 2015. CNET named her one of the 20 most influential Latinos in Silicon Valley. She has been recognized by the Peruvian government as one of the “Marca Peru” ambassadors (country brand ambassadors). Vasquez-Lavado is a member of the Explorers Club.

References

External links 
 

Social entrepreneurs
Seven Summits
Female climbers
Summiters of the Seven Summits
American mountain climbers
Peruvian mountain climbers
1974 births
People from Lima
Living people
American LGBT sportspeople
Peruvian explorers
American explorers
Female explorers
Lesbian sportswomen
LGBT climbers